Apepi (also Ipepi; Egyptian language ), Apophis; regnal names Neb-khepesh-Re, A-qenen-Re  and A-user-Re)  was a Hyksos ruler of Lower Egypt during the Fifteenth Dynasty and the end of the Second Intermediate Period. According to the Turin Canon of Kings, he reigned over the northern portion of Egypt for forty years during the early half of the 16th century BCE. Although officially only in control of the Lower Kingdom, Apepi in practice dominated the majority of Egypt during the early portion of his reign. He outlived his southern rival, Kamose, but not Ahmose I.

While Apepi exerted suzerainty over and maintained peaceful trade relations with the native Theban Seventeenth Dynasty to the south, the other kingdom eventually regained control. The Hyksos were driven out of Egypt no more than fifteen years after his death.

Kamose, the last king of the Seventeenth Dynasty, refers to Apepi as a "Chieftain of Retjenu" in a stela that implies a Canaanite background for this Hyksos king.

Praenomina
Neb-khepesh-Re, Aa-qenen-Re and Aa-user-Re are three praenomina (throne names) used by this same ruler during various parts of his reign. 
While some Egyptologists once believed that there were two separate kings who bore the name Apepi, namely Aauserre Apepi and Aaqenenre Apepi, it is now recognized that Khamudi succeeded Apepi at Avaris and that there was only one king named Apepi or Apophis. Nebkhepeshre ("Re is the Lord of Strength") was Apepi's first prenomen; towards the middle of his reign, this Hyksos ruler adopted a new prenomen, Aaqenenre ("The strength of Re is great"). In the final decade or so of his reign, Apepi chose Aauserre as his last prenomen. While the prenomen was altered, there is no difference in the translation of both Aaqenenre and Aauserre. His Horus name Shetep-tawy is attested only twice (once together with A-qenen-Re). It appears on an offering table<ref>Cairo Catalogue Generale 23073; Kamal, Tables d'offrandes I, 61</ref> and on blocks found at Bubastis.

Reign

Rather than building his own monuments, Apepi generally usurped the monuments of previous pharaohs by inscribing his own name over two sphinxes of Amenemhat II and two statues of Imyremeshaw. Apepi is thought to have usurped the throne of northern Egypt after the death of his predecessor, Khyan, since the latter had designated his son, Yanassi, to be his successor on the throne as a foreign ruler.  He was succeeded by Khamudi, the last Hyksos ruler. Ahmose I, who drove out the Hyksos kings from Egypt, established the 18th Dynasty.

In the Ramesside era, Apepi is recorded as worshiping Seth in a monolatric way: "[He] chose for his Lord the god Seth. He didn't worship any other deity in the whole land except Seth." Jan Assmann argues that because the Ancient Egyptians could never conceive of a "lonely" god lacking personality, Seth the desert god, who was worshiped exclusively, represented a manifestation of evil; and scholars generally believe the account of Apepi's alleged monotheism is a veiled condemnation of the more infamous attempt by the later pharaoh Akhenaten to elevate the status of his patron sun god, Aten.

There is some discussion in Egyptology concerning whether Apepi also ruled Upper Egypt. There are indeed several objects with the king's name most likely coming from Thebes and Upper Egypt. These include a dagger with the name of the king bought on the art market in Luxor. There is an axe of unknown provenance where the king is called beloved of Sobek, lord of Sumenu''. Sumenu is nowadays identified with Mahamid Qibli, about 24 kilometers south of Thebes and there is a fragment of a stone vessel found in a Theban tomb. For all these objects it is arguable that they were traded to Upper Egypt. More problematic is a block with the king's name found at Gebelein. The block had been taken as evidence for building activity of the king in Upper Egypt and, hence, seen as proof that the Hyksos also ruled in Upper Egypt. However, the block is not very big and many scholars argue today, that it might have reached Gebelein after the looting of the Hyksos capital and is no proof of a Hyksos reign in Upper Egypt.

The Rhind Mathematical Papyrus is dated to Year 33 of Apepi or Apophis while the Turin Kinglist assigns 40+ years to a Hyksos ruler who is most likely Apophis although his name is lost in a lacuna.

Family

Two sisters are known: Tani and Ziwat. Tani is mentioned on a door of a shrine in Avaris and on the stand of an offering table (Berlin 22487). She was the sister of the king. Ziwat is mentioned on a bowl found in Spain.

A 'Prince Apepi', named on a seal (now in Berlin) is likely to have been his son. Apepi also had a daughter, named Herit: a vase belonging to her was found in a tomb at Thebes, sometimes regarded as the one of king Amenhotep I, which might indicate that at some point his daughter was married to a Theban king. The vase, however, could have been an item which was looted from Avaris after the eventual victory over the Hyksos by Ahmose I.

See also
 List of pharaohs

References

Sources
 

16th-century BC Pharaohs
Pharaohs of the Fifteenth Dynasty of Egypt